The following is a partial list of direct action groups. Some groups known for their use of direct action include:

 ADAPT
 AIDS Coalition to Unleash Power (ACT UP)
 Anarchists Against the Wall (Israeli group)
 Anarchist Black Cross (ABC)
 Animal Liberation Front
 Animal Liberation Press Office
 Anonymous
 Antifa (United States)
 A Quaker Action Group
 BAMN
 Camp for Climate Action
 Campus Antiwar Network
 Code Pink
 Committee of 100 (United Kingdom)
 Communist Party of India (Maoist)
 Confederación Nacional del Trabajo
 Connolly Youth Movement
 Cop Block
 Cymdeithas yr Iaith Gymraeg
 Cypherpunk
 Direct Action Committee
 Direct Action Everywhere
 Direct Action to Stop the War
 Earth First!
 Earth Liberation Front
 Euromaidan
 Extinction Rebellion
 Food Not Bombs
 GetEQUAL
 Green Mountain Anarchist Collective
 Greenpeace
 Homes Not Jails
 Industrial Workers of the World
 Landless Workers' Movement
 Lesbian Avengers
 Movement for a New Society
 MindFreedom International
 National Bolshevik Party
 National Mobilization Committee to End the War in Vietnam
 No Border network
 Occupy Wall Street
 Operation Save America
 PETA
 Plane Stupid
 Reclaim the Streets
 Rising Tide North America
 School of the Americas Watch (SOA Watch)
 School strike for climate
 Sea Shepherd Conservation Society
 Sons of Liberty
 Southern Christian Leadership Conference (SCLC)
 Squamish Five
 Students for a Democratic Society
 Take Back the Land
 Trident Ploughshares
 UkUncut
 Vetëvendosje! - Movement for Self-determination in Kosova
 War Resisters' International
 WOMBLES
 Yellow vests movement
 Zero Hour

See also

 List of civil rights leaders
 Nonviolence
 Propaganda of the deed
 Rebellion
 Revolution
 Anarchism

References

Direct action
Direct action